Scalp Creek is a stream system in the U.S. state of South Dakota. According to the GNIS, it consists of North Scalp Creek and South Scalp Creek.

Scalp Creek received its name from an incident when a man was scalped by Sioux Indians.

See also
List of rivers of South Dakota

References

Rivers of Gregory County, South Dakota
Rivers of South Dakota